The Bukit Batok Memorial is located on top of the tranquil Bukit Batok Hill upon which once stood two war memorials built by Australian POWs to commemorate the war dead of the Japanese and the Allies who fought during the decisive Battle of Bukit Timah in Singapore during the Second World War. The two memorials were destroyed after the war and only the road and stairs that used to lead to them mark its legacy today.

History
Bukit Batok is located near the Bukit Timah area, where some of the heaviest fighting on the island—the Battle of Bukit Timah took place in early 1942. As a result, in June 1942, the Japanese wanted to build a war memorial and Shinto shrine to commemorate their war dead in the vicinity.

Allies' Memorial Cross

POW labour was used to build a total of three war memorials, including one dedicated to the fallen of the Indian National Army in June 1945, and a Shinto shrine called Syonan Jinja in MacRitchie Reservoir during the Occupation. English bombardier Stanley Warren of the Changi Murals fame, belonged to one of the work parties that built the stairs and a road named Lorong Sesuai, leading to the two memorials on top of Bukit Batok. The Japanese had originally planned just one memorial called Syonan Chureito for their war dead but the POWs asked the Japanese for permission to build a memorial to their own war dead near the Japanese memorial and had been given permission and materials to erect a  wooden cross behind Syonan Chureito. The Japanese had hoped to capitalise on the propaganda value of acceding to the request. The Japanese engineering commander-in-charge of the POWs then was Colonel Yasugi Tamura. About 500 Australian POWs mainly from the Artillery, and Infantry battalions, encamped at Sime Road and Adam Park were marched back and forth each day between the job site and their camp and worked tirelessly until both memorials were completed.

Syonan Chureito
On the night of 7 December 1942, in a solemn ceremony, the ashes of the Japanese war dead encased in white wooden boxes were brought to the foot of the long flight of steps leading to Syonan Chureito and ceremoniously carried up the torch-lit steps for interment inside a small shrine located at the top. The guest of honour was General Homma Masaharu of Philippines fame. The Japanese memorial was a 12 metres tall wooden mast capped with a brass cone. The words "chu rei to" was inscribed on its side which meant "the sacrifice made by the fallen soldiers". A plain, stout, wooden fence surrounded the memorial. The Allies' memorial was unveiled on the same day by one of the POW camp commanders with a speech thanking the Japanese Army. Military and Japanese officials would regularly worship the Japanese Emperor and the deified spirits of their fallen comrades at Syonan Chureito and Syonan Jinja.

Post-war years
The two memorials on the hilltop were torn down when the Japanese surrendered and all that remains are two entrance pillars and the 120 steps that now lead to a transmission tower operated by Mediacorp. Like Syonan Chureito, Syonan Jinja was destroyed too after the war to prevent it from being desecrated by the returning Allied forces. The ashes at the Japanese war memorial were subsequently re-interred in the Japanese Cemetery Park in Chuan Hoe Avenue. Upon a suggestion to the authorities by a former Australian POW, S. Hannam, in 1981, the Singapore Tourist Promotion Board and National Heritage Board (NHB) erected a memorial plaque at the foot of the steps to commemorate this little known history and the sufferings of the Australian POWs during the Japanese Occupation of Singapore. In 1995, the NHB gazetted the site as one of the 11 World War II sites in Singapore.

References

Notes

Bibliography

Buildings and structures completed in 1942
Japanese occupation of Singapore
Monuments and memorials in Singapore
World War II memorials
Tourist attractions in Singapore
Bukit Batok
1942 establishments in the Japanese colonial empire
20th-century architecture in Singapore